The water polo portion of the 2011 World Aquatics Championships was held between July 17–30 at the Shanghai Oriental Sports Center in Shanghai, China.

Medalists

Medal table

Men

Women

References

External links
Official website
Records and statistics (reports by Omega)

 
2011 in water polo
2011 World Aquatics Championships
2011
2011